Boeyens is a surname. Notable people with the surname include:

 Adriaan Florenszoon Boeyens, birth name of Pope Adrian VI
 Jan C. A. Boeyens (1934–2015), South African chemist and educator

See also
 Beyens
 Boelens
 Boyens